Carmine Church may refer to:

 Carmine Church, Carrara, a church in Carrara, Italy
 Chiesa del Carmine (Messina), a church in Messina, Italy
  (AKA Chiesa dei Carmini), Vicenza, Italy